Club Alianza Viedma, renamed as Ceferino Alianza Viedma for sponsorship reasons, is an Argentine basketball club from the city of Viedma, Río Negro. One of the newest clubs in Argentina, it was founded in 2009 and the team currently plays at the Torneo Nacional de Ascenso, the second division of Argentine basketball league system.

History
In 2009, "Club San Martín", promoted to Liga B, the third division of Argentine basketball. Due to its financial problems to solve the costs for taking part in a senior league, San Martín decided to merge with other two clubs from the city of Viedma, Villa Congreso and Sol de Mayo. The new institution was named "Alianza Viedma" to symbolize the allianz of three clubs.

Just two year after its establishment, Alianza promoted to Torneo Nacional de Ascenso, the second division of Argentine basketball. The club affiliated to Asociación de Básquet Valle Inferior and Federación Rionegrina de Básquet, with the purpose of registering its name officially.

During the 2011-12 season, Alianza reached the semi-finals, where they lost to Argentino de Junín in the 5th. game after two wins for each squad. The team made a great campaign playing at its home venue, where remained unbeaten for 19 consecutive fixtures.

Due to a sponsorship deal, the club changed its name to "Ceferino Alianza Viedma" in July 2012.

Players

Current roster

Notable players
 Sebastian Acosta
 Gaston Essengue

References

External links
Official Facebook

A
A